Fulgence Bienvenüe (27 January 1852 – 3 August 1936) was a noted French civil engineer, best known for his role in the construction of the Paris Métro, and has been called "Le Père du Métro" (Father of the Metro).

A native of Uzel in Brittany, and the son of a notary, in 1872 Bienvenüe graduated from the École Polytechnique as a civil engineer and the same year he began working for the Department of Bridges and Roads at Alençon. His first assignment was the construction of new railway lines in the Mayenne area, in the course of which his left arm had to be amputated after being crushed in a construction accident.

In 1886, Bienvenüe moved on to Paris to design and supervise the construction of aqueducts for the city, drawing water from the rivers Aube and Loire. Next, he built a cable railway near the Place de la République and created the park of Buttes-Chaumont. In 1891, he was appointed as Engineer-in-Chief for Bridges and Roads, the most prestigious engineering job in France.

Paris city officials selected Bienvenüe to become chief engineer for the Paris Métro in 1896. He designed a special way of building new tunnels which allowed the swift repaving of the roads above; this involved (among other things) building the crown of the tunnel first and the floor last, the reverse of the usual method at that time. Bienvenüe has the credit for the mostly swift and relatively uneventful construction of the Métro through the difficult and heterogenous Parisian soils and rocks. He came up with the idea of freezing wet and unstable soil in order to permit the drilling of tunnels. He was to supervise the Paris Metro construction for more than three decades, finally retiring on 6 December 1932.

Bienvenüe's construction of the Métro was widely praised and has been described admiringly as a work "worthy of the Romans". He eventually accumulated many honors for his engineering accomplishments, including the Grand Prix Berger of the Academy of Arts and Sciences (1909) and the Grand Cross of the Legion of Honor (1929).

On 30 June 1933, the Avenue du Maine station on the Metro was renamed Bienvenüe in his honor. The naming ceremony took place in his presence; there was a last-minute scramble to repaint the station's new nameboards when it was discovered that the unusual diaeresis in his name had been omitted, making it the French word for "welcome". In 1942 the station was linked to the adjacent Montparnasse station, forming a single station named Montparnasse-Bienvenüe.

Bienvenüe was buried in 1936 at the Père Lachaise Cemetery, Paris.

 high school in Loudéac, Brittany is named after Bienvenüe.

See also
Edmond Huet

References

External links

 Archived at Ghostarchive and the Wayback Machine: 

1852 births
1936 deaths
People from Côtes-d'Armor
French civil engineers
École Polytechnique alumni
École des Ponts ParisTech alumni
Corps des ponts
Burials at Père Lachaise Cemetery
French amputees
Paris Métro
Grand Croix of the Légion d'honneur
Scientists with disabilities